Agelasta balteata is a species of beetle in the family Cerambycidae. It was described by Francis Polkinghorne Pascoe in 1866. It is known from Malaysia, Java, and Sumatra. It contains the varietas Agelasta balteata var. niasica.

References

balteata
Beetles described in 1866
Taxa named by Francis Polkinghorne Pascoe